Architectural Histories is a peer-reviewed open access scholarly journal publishing historically grounded research into all aspects of architecture and the built environment, since 2013. It is published on behalf of the European Architectural History Network (EAHN), with Ubiquity Press. The current editor-in-chief is Petra Brouwer.

Abstracting and indexing 
The journal is abstracted and indexed in:

See also 
 List of architecture magazines

References

External links 
 

Open access journals
Publications established in 2013
English-language journals
Architectural history journals
Ubiquity Press academic journals